Novyye Irakty (Yañı İräkte) is a rural locality (a village) in Kudashevsky Selsoviet, Tatyshlinsky District, Bashkortostan, Russia. The population was 11 as of 2010. There is 1 street.

Geography 
Novyye Irakty is located 20 km west of Verkhniye Tatyshly (the district's administrative centre) by road. 1-y Yanaul is the nearest rural locality.

References 

Rural localities in Tatyshlinsky District